This is the list of members of the Senate of the Netherlands since 11 June 2019, elected in the 2019 Dutch Senate election.

Members

Notes

References 

2019-2023